The Whitehorn Generating Station is a power plant near Blaine, Washington, owned by Puget Sound Energy and located immediately west of BP's Cherry Point Refinery. The plant comprises two 75 MW natural gas-fueled combustion turbines.

History
The Whitehorn generating station began operation in 1974, with a single 60 MW combustion turbine. Two additional 75 MW turbines, Whitehorn 2 and 3, were added in 1981. The 60 MW turbine ceased operation in 2000. Puget Sound Energy purchased the previously-leased turbines in 2009.

See also

 List of power stations in Washington

References

Buildings and structures in Whatcom County, Washington
Natural gas-fired power stations in Washington (state)